The Sixteen Men of Tain is the tenth studio album by guitarist Allan Holdsworth, released in March 2000 through Gnarly Geezer Records (United States), Polydor Records (Japan) and JMS–Cream Records (Europe); a remastered edition was reissued in 2003 through Globe Music Media Arts. The album's title is a reference to the Glenmorangie distillery in Tain, Scotland. The Sixteen Men of Tain was the last recording to be made at Holdsworth's personal recording studio, The Brewery.

Critical reception

All About Jazz described The Sixteen Men of Tain as a "very comfortable listen" and recommended it highly, whilst noting that the album is less rock-orientated than past Holdsworth releases. David R. Adler at AllMusic awarded the album 4.5 stars out of 5, calling it "startlingly superb" and "full of fresh ideas and unadulterated improvisational brilliance". Both reviews also highlighted Holdsworth's more restrained use of the SynthAxe, an instrument featured prominently on all of his albums since Atavachron (1986).

Track listing

Personnel
Allan Holdsworth – guitar, SynthAxe, engineering, mixing, production
Gary Novak – drums (except track 6)
Chad Wackerman – drums (track 6)
Dave Carpenter – bass
Walt Fowler – trumpet
Duncan Aldrich – engineering
Chris Bellman – mastering

References

External links
The Sixteen Men of Tain at therealallanholdsworth.com (archived)
Allan Holdsworth "The Sixteen Men Of Tain" at Guitar Nine

Allan Holdsworth albums
2000 albums
Polydor Records albums